Living Hour is a Canadian indie rock band from Winnipeg, Manitoba.

History
Living Hour formed in 2013, with their first release being a The White Stripes cover. In 2015, the band released their first song on a four way split. The following year, the band released their self-titled debut album on Lefse Records. In 2019, the band released their second full-length album in 2019 titled Softer Faces on Kanine Records. The track "I Sink I Sink" appeared on the Season 1 soundtrack of Never Have I Ever.  In 2022, the band released their third full-length album titled Someday Is Today on Kanine Records.

Discography

Studio albums

 Living Hour (2016)
 Softer Faces (2019)
 Someday Is Today (2022)

Music Videos 

 Middle Name (2022)
 Hold Me in Your Mind (2022)
 Feelings Meeting (2022)
 No Body (2022)
 Miss Miss Miss (2022)
 Tulips at My Bedside (2021)
 Double Bus (2021)
 I Sink I Sink (2020)

References

Canadian indie rock groups
Musical groups established in 2013
Musical groups from Winnipeg
2013 establishments in Manitoba